Mária Molnár (born Budapest, 8 August 1966) is a Hungarian art historian, art critic, and art collection curator. She is the founding editor-in-chief of the tri-lingual Central European periodical, Praesens  and the founding chair of the National Art Salon of Hungary's "Foundation for a Civil Hungary."

References

1966 births
Hungarian art critics
European art curators
Hungarian art historians
Living people
Hungarian women curators